1-(Furan-2-yl)undecan-1-ol is an uncharged lipophilic degradation product of the surfactant ProteasMAX.

External links 
 Promega Notes 99, 3–7 (2008)

2-Furyl compounds
Fatty alcohols